Glycerol-3-phosphate dehydrogenase ( is an enzyme with systematic name sn-glycerol 3-phosphate:quinone oxidoreductase. This enzyme catalyses the following chemical reaction

 sn-glycerol 3-phosphate + quinone  glycerone phosphate + quinol

This flavin-dependent dehydrogenase is a membrane enzyme. It participates in glycolysis, respiration and phospholipid biosynthesis.

References

External links 
 

EC 1.1.5